The  Government of Rajasthan  is the supreme governing authority of the Indian state of Rajasthan and its 33 districts. It consists of an executive, led by the Governor of Rajasthan, a judiciary and a legislative. Jaipur is the capital of Rajasthan, and houses the Vidhan Sabha (Legislative Assembly) and the secretariat.

Government of Rajasthan

Like other states in India, the head of state of Rajasthan is the Governor, appointed by the President of India on the advice of the Central government. His or her post is largely ceremonial. The Chief Minister is the head of government and is vested with most of the executive powers.

Legislature
The present Legislature of Rajasthan is unicameral, consisting of Legislative Assembly, which consists of 200 M.L.A. The assembly sits for terms of a maximum of 5 years.

Judiciary
The Rajasthan High Court is having its principal seat in Jodhpur, and a bench at Jaipur which have respective jurisdiction over the neighboring districts of Rajasthan.

Head Leaders

Local Governments

Local governments consists of Panchayati Raj Institutions(PRIs) for rural areas and Municipalities or Urban Local Bodies(ULBs) for urban areas.

Web Directory 
Here is the web directory of Rajasthan

Apex Bodies

Autonomous Bodies

Boards and Undertakings

Departments

See also 
Rajasthan
Politics of Rajasthan
Rajasthan Police
University of Rajasthan
Outline of Rajasthan
Elections in Rajasthan
Rajasthan Public Service Commission
Rajasthan Legislative Assembly
Ashok Gehlot ministry (2018–2023)

References

External links
 Rajasthan Legislative Assembly (Vidhan Sabha)
 GOVERNMENT OF RAJASTHAN - Official Web Portal
 Rajasthan Single Sign On (One Digital Identity for All Applications)